Tuloy ang Ligaya is the sixth studio album by Filipino rock band Rivermaya. It was released in October 15, 2001 under Viva Records. The album features newly recruited guitarists Mike Elgar and Kakoy Legaspi, as well as bassist Japs Sergio; the three were recruited after founding bassist Nathan Azarcon left the group.

Critical reception

David Gonzales of allMusic reviewed the album and stating that the album has moments of brilliance but lacked excitement. He praised songs "Gising Na" & "Imposible", but criticized other songs like ""Basketbol" ("Basketball") and "Bagong Liwanag", which he described as being "tedious and dry."

Accolades

Track listing

Personnel 
Rico Blanco – lead vocals, guitar, keyboard & synths
Mark Escueta – drums & percussion, trumpet, backing vocals
Mike Elgar – guitar, backing vocals, lead vocals (tracks 7 & 10)
Japs Sergio – bass guitar
Kakoy Legaspi – guitar

Album credits 
Executive Producer: Vic del Rosario and Vincent G. del Rosario
Associate Producer: Rommel Sanchez
Produced by: Rico Blanco 
A&R: Mike Dizon
Art Direction: Rivermaya 
Album Cover Design & Layout: Mark Edward P. Escueta
Additional Layout: Adrian "GA" J. Cabet
Photography: Mark Edward P. Escueta and Jun de Leon

References

External links
 Titik Pilipino: The Online Resource for Filipino Songs

2001 albums
Rivermaya albums